Lynn Walker is a Professor of Chemical Engineering at Carnegie Mellon University. Her research considers the rheology of complex fluids and how nanostructure impacts the behavior of complex systems. She is a Fellow of the American Institute of Chemical Engineers, the Society of Rheology, and the American Physical Society.

Early life and education 
In 1990, Walker obtained her B.Sc. degree in chemical engineering at the University of New Hampshire. She then obtained her Ph.D. from the University of Delaware in 1995, under the supervision of Norman J. Wagner. She did her postdoctoral research at Katholieke Universiteit Leuven, where she continued to investigate the rheology and rheo-optics of liquid crystalline polymers.

Research and career 
In 1997, Walker joined the Department of Chemical Engineering at Carnegie Mellon University. Her research efforts look to develop rheological characterization and the development of macromolecular analytical techniques. Her early work characterized non-Newtonian fluids. She has since demonstrated that inkjet printing can be used for biomaterials and solution shearing can be used to control the order of block copolymers. She developed a microtensiometer platform that made it possible to study the dynamics of physical processes at oil-water interfaces.

Walker was a visiting professor at Polymer IRC, University of Leeds during her sabbatical in 2007. Within Carnegie Mellon University, Walker also has courtesy appointments in the Department of Chemistry and the Department of Materials Science & Engineering.

Awards and honors 
 2015 American Institute of Chemical Engineers Mentorship Excellence Award
 2016 Barbara Lazarus Award for Graduate Student and Junior Faculty Mentoring
 2017 Elected Fellow of the Society of Rheology
 2022 Fellow of the American Physical Society

Selected publications

References 

Living people
University of Delaware alumni
University of New Hampshire alumni
Carnegie Mellon University faculty
American chemical engineers
21st-century American scientists
American women scientists
20th-century American scientists
Fellows of the American Institute of Chemical Engineers
Fellows of the American Physical Society
Year of birth missing (living people)